My Son is a 1925 American silent drama film directed by Edwin Carewe and starring Alla Nazimova. Carewe produced with First National who distributed the film.

Plot
As described in a film magazine review, Tony, beloved son of Portuguese mother Anna Silva, allows his head to be turned in the summer resort colony by Betty Smith, daughter of a former neighbor now grown wealthy. She shows him how to become a popular dancing instructor. Afraid of losing her, he steals to keep up appearances. The theft is traced to him, but out of respect for his mother, the sheriff gives him a chance. In this crisis, the mother shows her strength and has him kidnapped and shanghaied for a two year's trip around the world. On board the ship is the young woman the mother wants him to marry.

Cast

Preservation
With no prints of My Son located in any film archives, it is a lost film.

References

External links

Still with Nazimova and Hobart Bosworth (University of Washington, Sayre Collection)

1925 films
American silent feature films
Lost American films
Films directed by Edwin Carewe
First National Pictures films
American black-and-white films
Silent American drama films
1925 drama films
1925 lost films
Lost drama films
1920s American films